The Grand Miroslav Zei Award for Life Work in the Field of the Activities of the National Institute of Biology is a scientific award in Slovenia awarded each year for outstanding scientific achievements in Biology. It has been bestowed since 2010 by the National Institute of Biology and includes a prize for achievements in research at the Institute and a grand award for achievements in Life and Environmental Sciences.

It is named after Miroslav Zei, the eminent Slovene biologist.

Grand Miroslav Zei Award laureates 
Source: National Institute of Biology

See also

 List of biology awards

References

Slovenian awards
Biology awards
Awards established in 2010